Abul Mansur Mirza Muhammad Muqim Ali Khan (c. 1708 – 5 October 1754), better known as Safdar Jang, was a major figure at the Mughal court during the declining years of the Mughal Empire. He became the second Nawab of Awadh when he succeeded Saadat Ali Khan I (his maternal uncle and father-in-law) in 1739. All future Nawabs of Oudh were patriarchal descendants of Safdar Jang.

Biography 
He was a descendant of Qara Yusuf of the Kara Koyunlu. In 1739, he succeeded his father-in-law and maternal uncle, Burhan-ul-Mulk Saadat Ali Khan I to the throne of Oudh and ruled from 19 March 1739 to 5 October 1754.. The Mughal Emperor Muhammad Shah gave him the title of "Safdar Jang".

Safdar Jang was an able administrator. He was not only effective in keeping control of Awadh, but also managed to render valuable assistance to the weakened Emperor Muhammad Shah. He was soon given governorship of Kashmir as well, and became a central figure at the Delhi court. During the later years of Muhammad Shah, he gained complete control of administration over the whole Mughal Empire. When Ahmad Shah Bahadur ascended the throne at Delhi in 1748, Safdar Jang became his Wazir-ul-Malik-i-Hindustan or Prime Minister of Hindustan. He was also made the governor of Ajmer and became the "Faujdar" of Narnaul. However, court politics eventually overtook him and he was dismissed in 1753. He returned to Oudh in December 1753 and selected Faizabad as his military headquarters and administrative capital. He died in October 1754 at the age of 46 years in Sultanpur near Faizabad.

Tomb

Safdar Jang's Tomb was built in 1754 and is situated on a road now known as Safdar Jang Road, in New Delhi.

Several other modern structures near the tomb also carry his name today like Safdar Jang Airport and Safdar Jang Hospital.

See also
Safdar Jung (film)
Safdarjung (Delhi)
Abul-Hasan ibn Mirza Ghiyas Beg

Notes

References

External links

 Indiacoins has an article on Safdarjung here
 Tomb of Safdarjung 

Mughal nobility
Nawabs of Awadh
1708 births
1754 deaths
Indian Shia Muslims
Indian people of Iranian descent
Kara Koyunlu
Politicians from Nishapur
18th-century Indian people
Grand viziers of the Mughal Empire